Muricopsis gofasi is a species of sea snail, a marine gastropod mollusk in the family Muricidae, the murex snails or rock snails.

Description

Distribution
This marine species occurs off Angola.

References

 Houart, R., 1993. Description of three new species and one new subspecies of Muricidae (Muricinae and Muricopsinae) from west Africa. Bollettino Malacologico 29(1-4): 17-30

External links
 MNHN, Paris: Muricopsis gofasi (holotype)

Muricidae
Gastropods described in 1993